Terence Albert O'Brien (1600 – 30 October 1651) was an Irish Roman Catholic Bishop of Emly. He was beatified among the 17 Irish Catholic Martyrs by Pope John Paul II on 27 September 1992.

Biography
O'Brien hailed from Cappamore, County Limerick. Both of his parents were from the noble family of O’Brien Arra. He joined the Dominicans in 1621 at Limerick, where his uncle, Maurice O'Brien, was then prior. He took the name "Albert" after the Dominican scholar Albertus Magnus. In 1622 he went to study in Toledo, returning eight years later to become prior at St. Saviour's in Limerick. In 1643 he was provincial of his order in Ireland. In 1647 he was consecrated Bishop of Emly by Giovanni Battista Rinuccini. 

During the Irish Confederate Wars, like most Irish Catholics, he sided with Confederate Ireland. His services to the Catholic Confederation were highly valued by the Supreme Council. The bishop would treat the wounded and support Confederate soldiers throughout the conflict. O'Brien was against a peace treaty that did not guarantee Catholic interests in Ireland and in 1648 signed the declaration against the Confederate's truce with the Earl of Inchiquin who had committed atrocities against Catholic clergy and civilians, and the declaration against the Protestant royalist leader the Duke of Ormonde in 1650 who, due to his failure to resist the Cromwellian conquest of Ireland was not deemed fit to command Catholic troops. He was one of the prelates, who, in August 1650 offered the Protectorate of Ireland to Charles IV, Duke of Lorraine.

In 1651 Limerick was besieged and O'Brien urged a resistance that infuriated the Ormondists and Parliamentarians. Following surrender he was denied quarter and protection. Major General Nicholas Purcell, Father Wolf, and Bishop O'Brien were court martialed and sentenced to death by New Model Army General Henry Ireton. O'Brien was hanged at Gallows Green.

Legacy
On 27 September 1992, O'Brien and sixteen other Irish Catholic Martyrs, including Dermot O'Hurley, were beatified by Pope John Paul II. A large backlighted portrait of him is on display in St. Michael's Church, Cappamore, Co. Limerick, which depicts him during The Siege of Limerick.

See also
 Dominicans in Ireland

References

External links
'Terence Albert O'Brien' file at Limerick City Library, Ireland
Lengthy biographic article from Hibernian Magazine 1864, p. 246

1600 births
1651 deaths
Clergy from Limerick (city)
17th-century Roman Catholic bishops in Ireland
O'Brien
Irish beatified people
17th-century Roman Catholic martyrs
17th-century venerated Christians
Beatifications by Pope John Paul II
Bishops of Emly
24 Irish Catholic Martyrs